Dolichoderus dentatus is a species of ant in the genus Dolichoderus. Described by Forel in 1902, the species is found in dry sclerophyll areas in eastern Queensland.

References

Dolichoderus
Hymenoptera of Australia
Insects described in 1902